Glossata (Fabricius, 1775) is the suborder of the insect order Lepidoptera that contains most lepidopteran species and includes all the superfamilies of moths and butterflies that have a coilable proboscis. (See also the suborders Zeugloptera, Aglossata, and Heterobathmiina).

References

External links

 
Insect suborders